Pseudestoloides costaricensis is a species of beetle in the family Cerambycidae. It was described by Breuning and Heyrovsky in 1961. It is known from Costa Rica.

References

Desmiphorini
Beetles described in 1961